Nikki IJzerman (born 6 August 2000) is a Dutch footballer who plays as a midfielder for ADO Den Haag in the Eredivisie.

Personal life
IJzerman was born in Dordrecht.

References

Living people
Dutch women's footballers
Eredivisie (women) players
2000 births
Women's association footballers not categorized by position
ADO Den Haag (women) players